Parasemnus is a genus of beetle in the family Cerambycidae, and contains the single species Parasemnus regalis. It is endemic to the central regions of Chile, and was first described in 1894 by Philbert Germain.

References 

Phlyctaenodini
Beetles described in 1894
Endemic fauna of Chile